Pauline Janet Smith (2 April 1882 – 29 January 1959) was a South African novelist, short story writer, memoirist and playwright.

Life
Pauline Smith was born on 2 April 1882 in Oudtshoorn, South Africa, and grew up in the Little Karoo. She was the elder of two daughters born to Herbert Urmson Smith, an English doctor, and his Scottish wife Jessie, from Aberdeen. At the age of thirteen she was sent to boarding school in Scotland. Smith never lived permanently in South Africa again, though throughout her life she made a number of extended visits to the country.  Her extended visit of 1913–1914, and the journal that she kept, formed the basis of many stories of The Little Karoo and her novel The Beadle.

In 1908 she met the English novelist Arnold Bennett, who encouraged her to write fiction about South Africa.  Eventually she published the two works for which she is best known: the story collection The Little Karoo (1925), and the novel The Beadle (1926).

Smith was also a friend of Frank Swinnerton.

She died on 29 January 1959 in Dorset, England. A collection of her papers are held at the University of Cape Town.

Works

 The Little Karoo. London : Jonathan Cape, 1925. With an introduction by Arnold Bennett.
 The Beadle. New York: Doran, 1927.
 A.B.: "... a minor marginal note". London: Jonathan Cape, 1933.
 Platkops Children. London, England: Cape, 1935.
 Hold Yourself Dear New York: J. Messner, 1965.

References

Further reading
 
 
 
 

1882 births
1959 deaths
20th-century South African novelists
20th-century South African women writers
20th-century short story writers
People from Oudtshoorn
South African women novelists
South African women short story writers
South African short story writers
South African people of English descent
South African people of Scottish descent
Women memoirists